Paraschistura nielseni is a species of ray-finned fish in the genus Paraschistura. This stone loach is found in the Helleh River and Mond River which drain into the northern Persian Gulf in Iran.

Footnotes 
 

nielseni
Fish described in 1998
Taxa named by Teodor T. Nalbant
Endemic fauna of Iran